is a ward of the city of Sakai in Osaka Prefecture, Japan. The ward has an area of 23.69 km² and a population of 147,413. The population density is 6,223 per square kilometer.

The wards of Sakai were established when Sakai became a city designated by government ordinance on April 1, 2006. 

The city has its municipal headquarters in Sakai-ku and Sakai City Museum is located in the area.

Train stations located in Sakai-ku
•	Central stations: Sakai-Higashi Station, Sakai Station, Sakai-shi Station
West Japan Railway Company (JR West)
Hanwa Line: Asaka Station - Sakaishi Station - Mikunigaoka Station - Mozu Station
Nankai Electric Railway
Nankai Main Line: Shichidō Station - Sakai Station - Minato Station
Nankai Kōya Line: Asakayama Station - Sakaihigashi Station - Mikunigaoka Station - Mozuhachiman Station
Hankai Tramway
Hankai Line: Yamatogawa - Takasu-jinja - Ayanocho - Shimmeicho - Myokokuji-mae - Hanataguchi - Oshoji - Shukuin - Terajicho - Goryomae - Higashi-Minato

References

External links

Ward office official webpage 

Wards of Sakai, Osaka